James Dodds (born 1957) is an East Anglian artist whose practice centers on painting, linocut and relief carving. Born in Brightlingsea, Essex, he now lives and works in Wivenhoe producing prints and books as the Jardine Press. He is the son of East Anglian artist Andrew Dodds and has been described as "boatbuilding’s artist laureate". He is arguably East Anglia's most famous contemporary artist after Dame Maggi Hambling.

Education
James Dodds followed an apprenticeship as a shipwright in Maldon, Essex from 1972 to 1976. He studied at Colchester Institute from 1976 to 1977, the Chelsea School of Art from 1977 to 1980 and the Royal College of Art in London from 1981 to 1984.

Works
Dodds exhibits regularly at Bircham Contemporary Arts Gallery (Holt, Norfolk), Messum's Fine Art Gallery (London), Hayletts Gallery (Maldon, Essex), North House Gallery (Manningtree, Essex) and Dowling Walsh Gallery (Maine USA).

His paintings and hand-made prints are inspired by boats and boat building, especially those craft peculiar to East Anglia. He had a major retrospective show, "Shipshape", at Firstsite at The Minories, Colchester in November 2001. This show subsequently toured at Whitstable, Herne Bay, Frome, Isle of Wight, Barnard Castle, National Maritime Museum Cornwall, National Maritime Museum at Greenwich, Great Yarmouth and Hartlepool. Dodds's work returned to Firstsite with a new exhibition called "Wood to Water". A timelapse film of Dodds making a large painting for this show called Timepeace is on his website.

On the 16 August 2016 Dodds received the John Nash medal from Colchester Art Society for his contribution to the arts.

His work has been purchased by Britten-Pears Library, Aldeburgh; Victoria and Albert Museum; Clacton & Rochford Hospitals; Chelmsford and Essex Museums; Ipswich Borough Council, Museums and Galleries; Colchester Borough Council; Horniman Museum, London. National Maritime Museum, Greenwich, UCS East Contemporary Art Collection;Ipswich, MMoFA, Madison, Georgia, USA; Masterworks Museum of Bermuda Art; The Sainsbury Centre, Norwich and many private collectors. He is better known for his dramatic linocuts of coastal towns, nautical myths and legends, as well as his large paintings of various boats.

In July 2007 Dodds received an honorary doctorate from the University of Essex in recognition of his "distinguished contribution to the local community as an artist and defender of our community and natural heritage." His style evokes the spirit of rural and maritime East Anglia with scenes of daily life and folklore. He has also conceived, illustrated and hand-produced a series of handmade artists' books.

A short film, "Shaped by the Sea", about Dodds, by Emily Harris for Classic Yacht TV was released in May 2014. Played Anthony's father in Joanna Hogg's Sundance Grand Jury winning Film The Souvenir & The Souvenir II

Awards
1999 Awarded GMC Trust Best in Show ‘Aldeburgh Beach’
2007 Honorary doctorate from University of Essex.
2012 Ian Collins biography “James Dodds Tide Lines" wins EDP Jarrolds East Anglian Art & Photography Book Award 
2016 John Nash medal from Colchester Art Society
2021 Ian Collins biography “James Dodds The Blue Boat”

Exhibitions

Selected solo exhibitions
1984/1995/1998/2000, Aldeburgh Festival 
1985, "Ship of Fools", Hatton Gallery, Newcastle upon Tyne 
1986, "Fish, Flesh or Fowl", Christchurch Mansion, Ipswich 
1989/1990/1995/1997, Printworks, Colchester 
1989/1992/1995, Bircham Contemporary Arts, Norfolk 
1990/1994/1995, Chappel Galleries, Essex
1992, Sue Rankin Gallery, London Two man show with John Bratby RA 
2001, North House Gallery, Manningtree with John Reay "Blue Boat". University of Essex Gallery 
2004/ 2006/ 2007/ 2009/ 2011/ 2013 /2015/ 2016/ 2017/ 2018 /2020 Messum's. Cork Street. London
2010/ 2012/ 2017Dowling Walsh Gallery, Rockland, Maine. USA
2015-2016 Wood to Water, Firstsite,Colchester
2019-2020 Wood to Water, National Maritime Museum Cornwall
2021 The Blue Boat, David Messum Fine Art,London

Selected group exhibitions
1991/1998/1999/2000, Royal Academy Summer Exhibition 
1993, Wetzlar, Germany 
1994, John Callahan Gallery, Boston, United States
1995, "4 from Wivenhoe". Courcoux & Courcoux, Hampshire "Ultra Marine", Liverpool "Forth, Tyne, Dogger", Brewery Arts, Cirencester 
1996, Peter Scott Gallery, Lancaster University "The Sea", Black Swan Arts, Frome
1997, City Arts Gallery. Leeds Union of Artists, St. Petersburg, Russia Mall Gallery, London
1999, Eastern Open. King's Lynn Arts Centre, Norfolk Mystic Seaport. USA: New York Ship Terminal, United States
2000, The Hunting Art Prizes. London
2000, "Alphabet Soup". Printworks, Sudbury, Suffolk
2001/2003,2006,2007,2008,2009,2010,2011, Messum's Cork Street. London 
2013, "Masterpieces,Art and East Anglia" Sainsbury Centre, Norwich.

Reviews
"Looking at the paintings of James Dodds for the first time one is struck by the literalness of the work, the sheer specificity of plank on frame built outward by the practiced hand of a man whose obsession with the form and structure of boats had taken him out of school at fifteen and into a shipyard apprenticeship. Slowly, however, the force of his artistry begins to gather beyond this initial impression. In a striking and mysterious piece of visual alchemy, what once seemed specific now glides toward the abstract. Parts, once distinct, become a whole. A lyric buoyancy emerges. Our consciousness fuses with our unconscious. The eye and the mind's eye become one."
-Mayher, Bill. "An Eye for Boats, A Sense of Place: The Art of James Dodds." Wooden Boat Publication 2008.

And in Dodd's world, as in ours, the water is always there. His landscapes, rather than showing a fish-eye view, show a sea's-eye view. Here mankind and its works are laid before us – frail, clever, tender, damaged, beautiful and trying to stay safely alive. His perspective shows us our home from the point of view of the outsider. We are perhaps seeing as a boatman would, or a Viking raider, a Wivenhoe smuggler, a war time mariner. We may be aloft at a masthead, we may be adrift in time. And we may be angels. Something about the work insists – we may be angels with salt on our wings.

A L Kennedy, writer and broadcaster.

References

1957 births
Living people
People from Brightlingsea
People from Wivenhoe